Liga I is futsal league in Romania, organized by the Romanian Football Federation.

Teams for the 2021–2022 season 

Autobergamo Deva
Futsal Klub Odorheiu Secuiesc
Club Sportiv United Galati
CFR Timișoara
Luceafarul Buzau
Club Sportiv Local Sportul Ciorăști
CFF Clujana Cluj-Napoca

Champions

External links
Federația Română de Fotbal (FRF) 

Futsal competitions in Romania
futsal
Romania
2002 establishments in Romania
Sports leagues established in 2002